How Science Changed Our World is a 2010 BBC television documentary presented by Robert Winston (first broadcast on 23 December 2010 on BBC One). It focuses on ten scientific advances, which according to the producers, had the biggest impact on our lives. Viewers were asked to vote on their favourite advancement.

Breakthroughs 
 Combined oral contraceptive pill
 Microchip
 Magnetic resonance imaging
 Laser
 Biomechanics
 World Wide Web
 Big Bang theory (Robert Winston's choice)
 Human Genome Project
 Stem cell research
 In vitro fertilisation

Credits 
 Series Producer: Sophie Todd
 Presenter: Robert Winston
 Producer: Naomi Austin

External links 
 How Science Changed Our World at BBC
 Review at The Independent

Results of the Viewer Poll 
With 23000 votes.
 Microchip (37.3%)
 World Wide Web (18.7%)
 Stem cell research (14.3%)
 Human Genome Project (10%)
 Laser (6.2%)
 Big Bang theory (6.1%)
 Magnetic resonance imaging (3.9%)
 In vitro fertilisation (2.8%)
 Combined oral contraceptive pill (2.7%)
 Biomechanics (2.1%) 
(These results have not been confirmed but are deemed reliable.)

BBC television documentaries about science
Documentary films about science
2010 television specials
2010 in science